Rail inspection is the practice of examining rail tracks for flaws that could lead to catastrophic failures.  According to the United States Federal Railroad Administration Office of Safety Analysis, track defects are the second leading cause of accidents on railways in the United States.  The leading cause of railway accidents is attributed to human error.  The contribution of poor management decisions to rail accidents caused by infrequent or inadequate rail inspection is significant but not reported by the FRA, only the NTSB.  Every year, North American railroads spend millions of dollars to inspect the rails for internal and external flaws. Nondestructive testing (NDT) methods are used as preventive measures against track failures and possible derailment.

History

The first rail inspections were done visually and with the Oil and Whiting Method (an early form of Liquid Penetrant Inspection).  Many sources cite that the need for better rail inspections came after a derailment at Manchester, New York, in 1911.  That particular accident resulted in the death of 29 people and injuries to 60 others.  The investigation of the accident revealed that the cause was a transverse fissure (a critical crack that lies perpendicular to the length of the rail) in the rail.  Further investigation in the late 1920s showed that this type of defect was quite common.  With increased rail traffic at higher speeds and with heavier axle loads today, critical crack sizes are shrinking and rail inspection is becoming more important.  In 1927, Dr. Elmer Sperry built a massive rail inspection car under contract with the American Railway Association.  Magnetic induction was the method used on the first rail inspection cars.  This was done by passing large amounts of the magnetic field through the rail and detecting flux leakage with search coils.  Since then, many other inspection cars have traversed the rails in search of flaws. In 1949 ultrasonic flaw detection was introduced by Sperry Rail Service (Named after Dr. Elmer Sperry), by the 1960s Ultrasonic Inspection Systems had been added to the entire Sperry Fleet. Rail inspection continues to advance to this day. Companies like Sperry Rail Service, Nordco Inc, Herzog Rail Testing, and many others continue to develop an ever-increasing array of technologies to detect internal flaws.

Defects and location

There are many effects that influence rail defects and rail failure.  These effects include bending and shear stresses, wheel/rail contact stresses, thermal stresses, residual stresses, and dynamic effects.

Defects due to contact stresses or rolling contact fatigue (RCF):
tongue lipping
head checking (gauge corner cracking)
squats - which start as small surface-breaking cracks
Other forms of surface and internal defects:
corrosion
inclusions
seams
shelling
transverse fissures
wheel burn

One effect that can cause crack propagation is the presence of water and other liquids.  When fluid fills a small crack and a train passes over, the water becomes trapped in the void and can expand the crack tip.  Also, the trapped fluid could freeze and expand or initiate the corrosion process.

Parts of a rail where defects can be found:
head
web
foot
switchblades
welds
bolt holes

A majority of the flaws found in rails are located in the head, however, flaws are also found in the web and foot.  This means that the entire rail needs to be inspected.

NDT methods

A list of methods used to detect flaws in rails:
Ultrasound - the most popular method
Visual Inspection - Primarily using cameras to detect broken or cracked joint bars in bolted rail. 
Liquid Penetrant Inspection (LPI) - used for manual inspection of joint bars and rail ends. 
Eddy current inspection - great for surface flaws & near-surface flaws
Magnetic Particle Inspection (MPI) - used for detailed manual inspection
Radiography - used on specific locations (often predetermined) such as bolt holes and where thermite welding was used
Magnetic induction or Magnetic flux leakage - earliest method used to locate unseen flaws in the railway industry
EMAT Electromagnetic Acoustic Transducer

Utilizing NDT methods
The techniques mentioned above are utilized in a handful of different ways.  The probes and transducers can be utilized on a "walking stick", on a hand pushed trolley, or in a handheld setup.  These devices are used when small sections of track are to be inspected or when a precise location is desired.  Many times these detail-oriented inspection devices follow up on indications made by rail inspection cars or rail trucks.  Handheld inspection devices are very useful for this when the track is used heavily because they can be removed relatively easily.  However, they are considered very slow and tedious, when there are thousands of miles of track that need an inspection.  

Rail inspection cars and HiRail trucks are the answer to today's high mileage inspection needs. The first rail inspection cars were created by Dr. Sperry. Since then, many new models have rolled out. These rail inspection cars are basically their own train with inspection equipment on board. The probes and transducers are mounted on carriages located underneath the inspection car. Modern-day inspection cars now use multiple NDT methods. Increased Camera systems for detection of broken joint bars or missing bolts. Eddy Current systems for the detection of near-surface defects.

There are many manufacturers of road/rail inspection trucks, otherwise known as HiRail trucks. These HiRail inspection cars are almost all ultrasonic testing exclusively, but there are some with the capability to perform multiple tests. These trucks are loaded with high-speed computers using advanced programs which recognize patterns and contain classification information. The trucks are also equipped with storage space, tool cabinets, and workbenches. A GPS unit is used with the computer to mark new defects and locate previously marked defects. The Federal Railroad Administration (FRA) requires that any indications of defects need to be hand-verified immediately. The GPS system allows a follow-up car to find precisely where the flaw was detected by the lead vehicle. One advantage to the HiRail trucks is that they can work around regular rail traffic without shutting down or slowing down entire stretches of track. An NTSB report on the Amtrak derailment in Oregon in 2006 documented this fact.

The future of rail inspection
With increased rail traffic carrying heavier loads at higher speeds, a quicker more efficient way of inspecting railways is needed. Lasers inspect railway geometry, but one day they might be utilized as a form of non-contact evaluation of the rail.  This most likely will be done with laser-optical transmitting transducers in ultrasonic testing.  Eliminating contact with the rail could one day allow high-speed detection of flaws. (Testing of rail is currently able to be done at 80 km per hour with a Speno US-6 Ultrasonics train) Another need for the future is a complete rail inspection system.  A step in this direction is a deeper investigation of the rail by using low-frequency eddy currents.  Other advancements could include neural network analysis of signals to improve defect detection and identification and longitudinal guided ultrasonics.  Improved rail quality, composition, and joining techniques could lead to better wear characteristics and a longer lifespan of the rail.  Some investigation into banitic steels looks promising.  A safe and portable means of filmless radiography could assist with onsite defect evaluation.  These are just a few advancements in the process of being developed for future use.

Example trains
 Doctor Yellow (Japan)
 New Measurement Train (United Kingdom)

See also

 Maintenance of way
 Nondestructive testing
 Rail tracks
 Work train
 Track checker
 Track geometry car

References

Cannon, D. F., Edel, K.-O., Grassie, S. L. & Sawley, K. "Rail defects: an overview." Fracture & Fatigue of Engineering Material & Structures. vol. 26. no.10. pp. 865–886.  Oct. 2003.
Eddy Current Inspection.  GE Inspection Technologies Ltd. – Hocking.  April 5, 2005. http://www.hocking.com/applications/rail/.
Federal Railroad Administration, Office of Safety Analysis.  "Train Accidents by Type and Major Cause from Form: FRA F 6180.54. Jan.-Dec, 2004."  April 6, 2005. http://safetydata.fra.dot.gov/officeofsafety/.
G-Scan.  "Practical Application"  Guided Ultrasonics (Rail) Ltd. April 6, 2005. http://www.guided-ultrasonics.com/rail/index.html.
Judge, Tom, engr. ed.  "Looking for flaws in all the right places."  Railway Age. vol. 203. no.12. pp. 29–31.  Dec. 2002.
Keefe, Kevin P.  "Track classifications - Classifying and inspecting railroad track." Trains Magazine.  Sept. 10, 2002.
National Transportation Safety Board.  April 6, 2005.  www.ntsb.gov.
Rail Inspection.  NDT Resource Center.  April 5, 2005.

External links
 
  illustrated description of the Sperry detecting system
Sperry Rail Defect Manual 1964 More information about the types of defects that can be found by the Sperry rail car
 Holland Trackstar 
Railway safety
Permanent way